This is a list of films which placed number-one at the weekend box office in Australia during 2008. Amounts are in Australian dollars.

(N.B.: Seemingly improper dates are due to holiday weekends or other occasions. N/A denotes information that is not available from Urban Cinefile.)

See also
 List of Australian films – Australian films by year

2008
Australia
2008 in Australian cinema